Ossama Meslek (born 8 January 1997) is an Italian middle-distance runner who specialises in the 1500 metres.

Biography
Meslek gained his first international experience in 2018 when he finished fifth at the U23 Mediterranean Championships in Jesolo in 3:55.04. The following year he reached eighth place at the 2019 European Athletics U23 Championships in Gävle in 3:51.97.

In 2019 Meslek was Italian indoor champion in the 3000 metres.

National records
 1500 m indoor: 3:37.29 ( Birmingham, 12 February 2022) - Current holder

Personal bests 
 1500 m: 3:37.25 min, 16 June 2022 in Copenhagen
 1500 m (Indoor): 3:37.29 min, 19 February 2022 in Birmingham
 Mile: 3:55.39 min, 19 May 2022 in London
 Mile (Indoor): 4:15.32 min, 7 February 2016 in Cardiff
 3000 m (Indoor): 7:44.35 min, 12 February 2022 in Metz

National titles
 Italian Athletics Championships
 1500 metres: 2022
 Italian Athletics Indoor Championships
 3000 metres: 2019, 2023

See also
 List of Italian records in athletics

References

External links 
 

Living people
1997 births
Sportspeople from Vicenza
Italian male middle-distance runners
Mediterranean Games medalists in athletics
Athletes (track and field) at the 2022 Mediterranean Games
Mediterranean Games bronze medalists for Italy